Hibbertia polystachya is a species of flowering plant in the family Dilleniaceae and is endemic to the south-west of Western Australia. It is an erect to sprawling or straggly shrub with narrow elliptic to linear leaves and yellow flowers arranged in groups of up to five with about ten stamens and a similar number of staminodes, arranged on one side of two hairy carpels.

Description

Taxonomy
Hibbertia polystachya was first formally described in 1863 by George Bentham in Flora Australiensis from specimens collected by James Drummond in the Swan River Colony and Augustus Oldfield near the Blackwood River.<ref name="Benth.">{{cite book |last1=Bentham |first1=George |title=Flora Australiensis |date=1863 |publisher=Lovell Reeve & Co. |location=London |pages=22–23 |url=https://www.biodiversitylibrary.org/item/3669#page/80/mode/1up |access-date=22 August 2021}}</ref> The specific epithet (polystachya) means "many flower spikes".

Distribution and habitat
This hibbertia grows in woodland, mallee and heathland from near Mingenew to Katanning and Kojonup in the Avon Wheatbelt, Geraldton Sandplains, Jarrah Forest, Mallee and Swan Coastal Plain biogeographic regions of south-western Western Australia.

Conservation statusHibbertia polystachya'' is classified as "not threatened" by the Western Australian Government Department of Parks and Wildlife.

See also
List of Hibbertia species

References

persquamata
Eudicots of Western Australia
Plants described in 1863
Taxa named by George Bentham